CJRM-FM is a Canadian radio station, broadcasting at 97.3 FM in Labrador City. It is a francophone community radio station branded as Rafale FM. Although still a licensed station, it has not broadcast regularly since 2015, due to a combination of technical and staffing problems.

On July 21, 2009, Radio communautaire du Labrador Inc. applied to add rebroadcasterrs in La Grand'Terre (CKIP-FM 96.1) and St. John's (CKIJ-FM 95.7). The CRTC approved the applications on September 14, 2009. The St. John's transmitter is reported to have launched in April 2011.

The station is currently the only broadcasting service in the province that originates locally oriented programming for the Franco-Newfoundlander community. Radio-Canada's Première Chaîne has four transmitters in the province, including Labrador City, St. John's and the Port au Port area, and Espace Musique has a transmitter in St. John's, although those services rebroadcast stations from other provinces and do not originate any programming in Newfoundland and Labrador.

On November 22, 2012, Radio communautaire du Labrador received CRTC approval to change the authorized contours of CKIP-FM La Grand'Terre, by increasing the transmitter's average ERP from 42 to 142 watts (maximum ERP of 250 to 632 watts) and to decrease the EHAAT from -17.6 to -37.6 metres.

The station is said to have stopped broadcasting "somewhere in 2015". The station faced controversy in 2019 when it was revealed that the station had continued to bill and accept payment for advertising that it had not aired. The CRTC announced an investigation into the allegations.

References

External links
 Rafale FM
 
 
 
 

Jrm
Jrm
Labrador City
Jrm